USNS Sisler (T-ARK-311) is one of Military Sealift Command's nineteen Large, Medium-Speed Roll-on/Roll-off Ships and is part of the 33 ships in the Prepositioning Program. She is a Watson-class vehicle cargo ship named for First Lieutenant George K. Sisler, a Medal of Honor recipient.

Laid down on 15 April 1997 and launched on 28 February 1998, Sisler was put into service in the Pacific Ocean on 1 December 1998. She is operated by a civilian crew of 26, plus up to 50 active duty personnel.

External links

References

 

Watson-class vehicle cargo ships
Ships built in San Diego
1998 ships